The 1950 Georgia Bulldogs football team was an American football team that represented the University of Georgia as a member of the Southeastern Conference (SEC) during the 1950 college football season. In their 12th year under head coach Wally Butts, the team compiled an overall record of 6–3–3, with a mark of 3–2–1 in conference play, placing sixth in the SEC.

Schedule

References

Georgia
Georgia Bulldogs football seasons
Georgia Bulldogs football